Subachoque may refer to:
 Subachoque, a municipality in the department of Cundinamarca, Colombia
 the deadliest airplane crash location of 1947
 Subachoque Formation, a geological formation outcropping near and named after Subachoque
 Subachoque River, a river in the valley of Subachoque

Muysccubun